St. Paul's Anglican Church is a historic Carpenter Gothic style Anglican church building located on the corner of Front and Church streets in Dawson City, Yukon, Canada. Built of wood in 1902, it once served as the cathedral of the Anglican Diocese of Yukon until the diocesan see was moved to Whitehorse in 1953. Its steep pitched roof, its pointed arch entry through its belfry tower and its lancet windows are typical of Carpenter Gothic churches. St. Paul's was designated a National Historic Site of Canada on June 1, 1989.

St. Paul's is still an active parish in the Diocese of Yukon. The Ven. Laurie Munro is its incumbent priest, while the Rev. Percy Henry is its deacon. Lay Ministers are Mabel Henry, Shirley Pennell and Betty Davidson.

References

External links
 St. Paul's Anglican Church website

Churches completed in 1902
20th-century Anglican church buildings in Canada
National Historic Sites in Yukon
Anglican church buildings in Yukon
Carpenter Gothic church buildings in Canada
Former cathedrals in Canada
Buildings and structures in Dawson City
Churches in Yukon
Churches on the National Historic Sites of Canada register
1902 establishments in Yukon
Anglican Province of British Columbia and Yukon